Joshua Richards (born March 22, 1988) is an American professional stock car racing driver from Shinnston, West Virginia. He currently competes full-time in the World of Outlaws Late Model Series, in the No. 1R Rocket Chassis for Boom Briggs Racing, where he has been a champion in 2009, 2010, 2013, and 2016. Richards was also a champion in the Lucas Oil Late Model Dirt Series in 2017.

Richards has raced on asphalt. He competed in the ARCA Racing Series, NASCAR K&N Pro Series East, NASCAR Camping World Truck Series and peaked with 14 starts in the 2012 NASCAR Nationwide Series.

Racing career

NASCAR and ARCA

Richards raced in eight NASCAR Truck races in 2011 with a top finish of thirteenth at Talladega. In 2012, he raced in one Truck race and fourteen Nationwide races. His best Nationwide finish was a sixteenth-place finish at Daytona. He made a few dirt late model starts in 2012, and switch back to late models in 2013 after he had no stock car ride.

Dirt track racing

Richards raced the house car for his father's Rocket Chassis team in national dirt late model series for eleven years until 2016. He won the World of Outlaws Late Model Series in 2009, 2010, and 2013. He raced for Best Performance Motorsports in 2016 and won the World of Outlaws championship in a Rocket chassis as well as the 2017 Lucas Oil championship. He switched to Clint Bowyer Racing in 2019, remaining in a Rocket chassis. As of 2019, Richards has over 100 wins in Lucas Oil and World of Outlaws competition. Richards won his third dirt late model race of 2020 at Eldora Speedway by winning the $10,000 opening night of the Intercontinental Classic against a field of invitation-only drivers.

Motorsports career results

NASCAR
(key) (Bold – Pole position awarded by qualifying time. Italics – Pole position earned by points standings or practice time. * – Most laps led.)

Nationwide Series

Camping World Truck Series

 Ineligible for series points

K&N Pro Series East

ARCA Racing Series
(key) (Bold – Pole position awarded by qualifying time. Italics – Pole position earned by points standings or practice time. * – Most laps led.)

References

External links

 
 

NASCAR drivers
1988 births
Living people
ARCA Menards Series drivers
Racing drivers from West Virginia
People from Shinnston, West Virginia
Kyle Busch Motorsports drivers